William Robinson (24 November 1863 – 21 March 1928) was a New Zealand cricketer. He played 12 first-class matches for Auckland between 1902 and 1913.

He was Auckland's regular wicketkeeper in home matches from 1906 to 1913. Only one of his 12 first-class matches was not played in Auckland.

Robinson's parents migrated from England to New Zealand in the 1890s. He and his brother George operated a building business in Auckland for many years. He died after a long illness.

See also
 List of Auckland representative cricketers

References

External links
 
 

1863 births
1928 deaths
New Zealand cricketers
Auckland cricketers
Sportspeople from Cambridge